Criner is a surname. Notable people with the surname include:

Jim Criner (born 1940), American football player and coach
Juron Criner (born 1989), American football player
Laurence Criner (fl. 1926-1950), American actor
Mark Criner (born 1966), American football coach

See also
Criner, Oklahoma